The Potted Gardener is the third Agatha Raisin mystery novel by Marion Chesney under her pseudonym M. C. Beaton.

References

1994 British novels
British detective novels
British mystery novels
Agatha Raisin series
British novels adapted into films
Minotaur Books books